Frederick P. Nickles (February 10, 1948 – June 17, 2017) was an American politician who served in the New Jersey General Assembly from the 2nd Legislative District from 1992 to 1994.

He died on June 17, 2017, in Egg Harbor Township, New Jersey at age 69.

References

1948 births
2017 deaths
County commissioners in New Jersey
Mayors of places in New Jersey
Republican Party members of the New Jersey General Assembly
People from Egg Harbor Township, New Jersey
Politicians from Atlantic County, New Jersey